Moallem Kola or Moallem Kala may refer to:
 Moallem Kola, Amol
 Moallem Kola, Babol
 Moallem Kola, Mahmudabad
 Bala Moallem Kola, Sari County
 Pain Moallem Kola, Sari County